Lippetal is a municipality in the district of Soest, in North Rhine-Westphalia, Germany.

Geography 
Lippetal is located north and south of the river Lippe between the cities of Lippstadt and Hamm. Lippetal is situated at the northern boundary of the Soester Börde, south of the river Lippe and the southern Münsterland in north of the river. The river Lippe flows from east to the west through the municipality.

Division of the municipality 
There are eleven villages in Lippetal:

Neighbouring Places 
 Ahlen
 Bad Sassendorf
 Beckum
 Hamm
 Lippstadt
 Soest
 Wadersloh

History 
The municipality Lippetal was created by administrative reorganization in 1969. Lippetal was made with eleven villages from three different districts.

The villages are mostly old Saxon settlements. The villages Oestinghausen and Lippborg were first mentioned in 1189, Hovestadt in 1213, and the place of pilgrimage Herzfeld in a document in 786.

Personalities 
William Finnemann (1882-1942), priest of the Society of the Divine Word, auxiliary bishop of Manila and apostolic vicar of Calapan,
 Leon (* 1969 as  Jürgen Göbel ) German percussionist
 Dirk Langerbein (* 1971)  former football goalkeeper, now goalkeeper coach

References

External links 
 Official site 

Soest (district)